Baltimore Grand is a historic bank building located at Baltimore, Maryland, United States. It occupies two historic bank buildings, the former Western National Bank (1881, remodeled 1912) and the former Eutaw Savings Bank (1887, remodeled 1911), which were connected in 1989 and adaptively reused to create a commercial catering and banquet facility.  It features a large arched window above the entrance portico that is framed by paired fluted pilasters with Corinthian capitals extending to the cornice line.

The former Eutaw Savings Bank is a Classical Revival brownstone, built when the bank vacated the Baltimore Equitable Society Building across the street. The original building was designed by Charles L. Carson. A 1911 addition was designed by Baldwin and Pennington. Further alterations were carried out in 1912 by the firm of George C Haskell, a Carson protégé, and his partner G. Summerfield Barnes.

Baltimore Grand was listed on the National Register of Historic Places in 2000.

References

External links

Commercial buildings on the National Register of Historic Places in Baltimore
Commercial buildings completed in 1881
Downtown Baltimore
Neoclassical architecture in Maryland
Bank buildings on the National Register of Historic Places in Maryland
Charles L. Carson buildings
1881 establishments in Maryland